The 1800–01 United States Senate elections were held on various dates in various states, coinciding with Thomas Jefferson being elected to the White House. As these U.S. Senate elections were prior to the ratification of the Seventeenth Amendment in 1913, senators were chosen by state legislatures. Senators were elected over a wide range of time throughout 1800 and 1801, and a seat may have been filled months late or remained vacant due to legislative deadlock. In these elections, terms were up for the senators in Class 3.

Although the Federalists began the 7th Congress with a slim majority, Jefferson's Democratic-Republican Party took over the majority shortly thereafter due to mid-year special elections. By the time the first proper session of the 7th Congress met in December 1801, three seats had been gained by the Democratic-Republicans, leaving them with an overall majority of 17 seats and a government trifecta.

Change in composition

Before the November elections 
After the November 6, 1800 special election in New York.

Result of the November elections

Beginning of the 7th Congress, March 4, 1801

End of 1801

Race summaries 
Except if/when noted, the number following candidates is the whole number vote(s), not a percentage.

Special elections during the preceding Congress 
In these special elections, the winner was seated before March 4, 1801; ordered by election date.

Races leading to the next Congress 
In these regular elections, the winner was seated on March 4, 1801; ordered by state.

All of the elections involved the Class 3 seats.

Special elections during the next Congress 
In these special elections, the winner was seated after March 4, 1801; ordered by election date.

Connecticut 

Federalist Uriah Tracy was easily re-elected.

Georgia

Kentucky

Maryland

Maryland (special, 1800) 

William Hindman won election over Richard Tilghman Earle by a margin of 10.11%, or 9 votes, for the Class 3 seat.

Maryland (regular) 

The Maryland legislature failed to elect a senator before the March 4, 1801 beginning of the term. As such, William Hindman was appointed to fill the vacancy, and retired when a successor was elected.

Maryland (special, 1801) 

Robert Wright won election over William Winder by a margin of 39.53%, or 34 votes, for the Class 3 seat.

Massachusetts

Massachusetts (special, class 2)

Massachusetts (special, class 1)

New Hampshire

New Hampshire (regular)

New Hampshire (special)

New Jersey (special)

New York

New York (regular)

New York (special, class 1)

New York (special, class 3)

North Carolina

Pennsylvania

Pennsylvania (regular)

Pennsylvania (special)

Rhode Island (special)

South Carolina

South Carolina (regular)

South Carolina (special)

Vermont

Vermont (regular)

Vermont (special)

See also 
 1800 United States elections
 1800 United States presidential election
 1800–01 United States House of Representatives elections
 6th United States Congress
 7th United States Congress

References

 Party Division in the Senate, 1789-Present, via Senate.gov